Qais bin ʿAbdul-Munʿim Az-Zawāwī (27 August 1935 – 11 September 1995) was the second foreign minister for the Sultanate of Oman, and later from 1982 served as Deputy Prime Minister for Economic and Financial affairs until his tragic death on September 11, 1995, in the Salalah accident, whilst in the car with His Majesty Sultan Qaboos bin Said, and his brother Dr Omar bin Abdul-Mun'im Al-Zawawi, the external liaison for the Sultan.

Before returning to Oman, after the Sultan deposed his father in a bloodless coup, the deputy prime minister, Qais Al Zawawi studied in India and then moved to Dubai, where he set up the Pepsi-Cola Operations with Sheikh Rashid bin Saeed Al Maktoum, the then Ruler of Dubai (1958–1990), and Sultan bin Ali Al Owais and Mohamed Yehia Zakaria, both prominent business men.

Qais Al Zawawi is the founder of Alawi Enterprises.

See also
 Zawawi Mosque

References

1935 births
1995 deaths
Foreign ministers of Oman
Omani businesspeople
Omani expatriates in the United Arab Emirates
Road incident deaths in Oman
20th-century businesspeople